JTL (제이티엘) were a South Korean dance music group, consisting of the former H.O.T. members who left SM Entertainment – Jang Woo-hyuk, Tony Ahn and Lee Jae-won. The group was named after the initials of the members' stage name. After the release of their second album Run Away, the group have dissolved and the band members started pursuing solo careers.

When the group debuted in 2001 with single "A Better Day", which covered a 2001 song "A Better Day" by Norwegian band Multicyde, again based on the 1977 Norwegian song "Vårsøg", member Tony An claimed that promoting their song had been difficult due to strained relationship with Lee Soo-man, the producer of SM Entertainment. Lee blocked the music video from various Korean entertainment broadcasts which drew angry reactions from the group's fans, some of whom egged the company's main building in Seoul. The members of the group also had strained relationships between Kangta and Moon Hee-jun after the two chose to stay with SM Entertainment as solo artists. However, after appearances on 'X-Man', it appears that Tony and Kangta are on good terms the same goes for Moon Hee Jun and Jang Woo Hyuk who both appeared on variety show Heroine.

In 2003 the group won the "favorite artist of Korea" award at the MTV Asia Awards.

Discography

Studio albums

Awards

Mnet Asian Music Awards

See also
H.O.T.

References

South Korean boy bands
South Korean dance music groups
K-pop music groups
Musical groups established in 2001
Musical groups disestablished in 2003